Yuri Nikolayevich Adzhem (born 14 January 1953) is a Russian former football coach and player.

Honours
 1976 UEFA European Under-23 Football Championship winner
 1980 UEFA European Under-21 Football Championship winner

International career
Adzhem made his debut for USSR on March 28, 1979 in a friendly against Bulgaria. He also played in a UEFA Euro 1980 qualifier against Hungary.

External links 
  Profile

1953 births
Living people
Soviet footballers
Soviet Union international footballers
SC Tavriya Simferopol players
PFC CSKA Moscow players
Russian football managers
Soviet expatriate footballers
Expatriate footballers in East Germany
Association football defenders